Daniel Andrew Wells (born March 4, 1977) is an American horror and science fiction author. Wells's first published novel, I Am Not a Serial Killer, was adapted into a movie in 2016.

Early life
Dan Wells spent his childhood in Salt Lake City, Utah, and began writing at a young age. While in the second grade, he wrote his first stories based on the Choose Your Own Adventure series. He has cited Where the Wild Things Are as one of his first influences.  During his childhood, Wells was also exposed to science fiction and fantasy: namely, titles such as The Hobbit and Star Wars. He frequented the library and loved to read. In addition to sci-fi and fantasy novels, he read classics, including those of French and Russian literature. He also enjoyed writing scripts, songs, and poetry as a child.

In high school, Wells wrote a series of comic books, novellas, and a serial. He began to take writing more seriously in college, finishing his first serious novel when he was 22. He studied English and anthropology at Brigham Young University (BYU). It was there that he met his wife, Dawn. As a student, Wells also worked on BYU's speculative fiction magazine, Leading Edge, and began writing game reviews; he has since described himself as a "rabid gamer". Before becoming a published novelist, he worked as a corporate writer for NuSkin.

Career
Wells's debut novel, I Am Not a Serial Killer, was published in 2009. It has been printed in English, Spanish, French, German, and Russian. Wells did extensive research to make the novel's protagonist, John Cleaver, appear genuine. His fascination with serial killer predictors also inspired him to write the novel. In 2016, it was adapted into a film, starring Max Records and Christopher Lloyd. Wells wrote a sequel, Mr. Monster, which was published by Tor Books in 2010. In 2011, his third installment to the John Cleaver series, I Don't Want to Kill You, was published. Wells continued John Cleaver's story with a second trilogy, in which the protagonist changes and develops. In 2016, Wells told Deseret News that the fifth book in the series, Over Your Dead Body, was one of the most challenging to write. Some of Wells's novels feature main characters with mental health issues. In Serial Killer, John Cleaver is diagnosed with antisocial personality disorder, and the protagonist of The Hollow City has schizophrenia.

Wells expanded into young adult dystopia with Partials Sequence in 2012.  The series made an appearance on the New York Times Best Seller list for children's series in 2014. He followed up in 2016 with a Young Adult science fiction novel, Bluescreen, set in Los Angeles in the year 2050. He continued this Mirador series with Ones and Zeroes in 2017 and Active Memory in 2018. Other releases include middle-grade sci-fi audiobooks Zero G (2018), Dragon Planet (2019), and Stargazer (2021).

Wells is one of the four authors (including Mary Robinette Kowal, Brandon Sanderson, and Howard Tayler) who regularly host the podcast Writing Excuses. Wells was a writer for the 2017 TV series Extinct and wrote his own stage play, "A Night of Blacker Darkness".

In 2022, he became the Vice President of Narrative for Brandon Sanderson's company, Dragonsteel Entertainment.

Personal life 
He is the brother of author Robison Wells. He has six children. He has lived in Utah, Mexico, and Germany.
He also has his own YouTube channel on which he reviews TTRPGS (Tabletop role-playing game). The channel shares his name.

He and author Brandon Sanderson make the podcast Intentionally Blank together where they discuss everything from writing to other fantasy-related topics to their own lives and more.

Wells is a "card-carrying socialist" but does not like Cats: the musical.

He is a member of the Church of Jesus Christ of Latter-day Saints.

Critical reception
School Library Journal described his novel Bluescreen as "exciting and innovative". A School Library Journal review of Ones and Zeroes complimented Wells's complex and diverse characters, plausible dystopian plot, and understandable descriptions of future technology. Kirkus said that Partials' "rushed ending" signaled there would be a sequel.

In 2011, Wells was nominated for the John W. Campbell Award for Best New Writer. His novella, The Butcher of Khardov, received a nomination for the Hugo Award for Best Novella in 2014; Wells stated that this was the result of his unwittingly having been selected by Larry Correia for the Sad Puppies campaign.

He is a cohost of Writing Excuses, which won the Hugo Award for Best Fancast and three Parsec Awards.

In February 2017, Wells was the Literary Guest of Honor and Keynote Speaker at the 35th annual Life, the Universe, & Everything professional science fiction and fantasy arts symposium.

Bibliography

John Wayne Cleaver series
First trilogy
I Am Not a Serial Killer (December 2009, Tor Books)
Mr. Monster (September 2010, Tor Books)
I Don't Want to Kill You (March 2011, Tor Books)
Next of Kin (July 2014, Fearful Symmetry) (novella)
Second trilogy
The Devil's Only Friend (June 2015, Tor Books)
Over Your Dead Body (May 2016, Tor Books)
Nothing Left To Lose (June 2017, Tor Books)

Partials Sequence
Isolation novella prequel (August 2012, Balzer + Bray)
Partials (February 2012, Balzer + Bray)
Fragments (February 2013, Balzer + Bray)
Ruins (March 2014, Balzer + Bray)

Mirador series
Bluescreen (February 2016, Balzer + Bray)
Ones and Zeroes (February 2017, Balzer + Bray)
Active Memory (February 2018, Balzer + Bray)

The Zero Chronicles
Zero G (December 6, 2018, Audible Originals)
Dragon Planet (December 12, 2019, Audible Originals)
Stargazer (February 18, 2021, Audible Originals)

Stand-alone novels
A Night of Blacker Darkness, written as Frederick Whithers (author) and Cecil G. Bagsworth III (editor) (July 2011, Fearful Symmetry)
The Hollow City (July 2012, Tor Books)
Extreme Makeover (November 2016, Tor Books)
Ghost Station (November 2019, Audible Originals)

Apocalypse Guard 

 The Apocalypse Guard (with Brandon Sanderson, forthcoming)

Short stories
"The Amazing Adventures of George" in Leading Edge #40 (September 2000)
 "Charybdis" in Leading Edge #61 (June 2011)
 "The Mountain of the Lord" in Monsters & Mormons edited by Theric Jepson and Wm. Morris (October 2011, Peculiar Pages)

Novellas
 The Butcher of Khardov (June 2013, Privateer Press)

Editorials
 How to Write Good (September 2000), in Leading Edge #40

Awards 

2016 Association for Mormon Letters Award for Best Novel  Over Your Dead Body
2016 AML Award for Best Novel  Over Your Dead Body
 2015 Whitney Award for Speculative Fiction  The Devil's Only Friend
2011 Whitney Award for Best Novel of the Year  I Don't Want to Kill You
2010 Whitney Award for Best Novel of the Year  Mr. Monster
2009 Whitney Award for Best Novel by a New Author  I Am Not a Serial Killer

References

Additional reading
Interview with Teenreads, March 2, 2017

External links

Dan Wells's author website
Dan Wells's blog
Writing Excuses Website

Dan Wells literary manuscripts, MSS 8073 at L. Tom Perry Special Collections, Brigham Young University

1977 births
21st-century American male writers
21st-century American novelists
American horror writers
American male novelists
American male short story writers
American science fiction writers
American writers of young adult literature
Brigham Young University alumni
Harold B. Lee Library-related 21st century articles
Latter Day Saints from Utah
Living people
Novelists from Utah
People from North Salt Lake, Utah